Boone County is a county in the U.S. state of Nebraska. As of the 2020 United States Census, the population was 5,386. Its county seat is Albion. The county was organized in 1871 and named after Daniel Boone.

In the Nebraska license plate system, Boone County is represented by the prefix 23 (it had the 23rd-largest number of vehicles registered in the county when the license plate system was established in 1922).

Geography

Major highways

  Nebraska Highway 14
  Nebraska Highway 32
  Nebraska Highway 39
  Nebraska Highway 45
  Nebraska Highway 52
  Nebraska Highway 56
  Nebraska Highway 91

Adjacent counties

 Madison County – northeast
 Platte County – southeast
 Nance County – south
 Greeley County – southwest
 Wheeler County – northwest
 Antelope County – north

Demographics

As of the 2000 United States Census, there were 6,259 people, 2,454 households, and 1,700 families in the county. The population density was 9 people per square mile (4/km2). There were 2,733 housing units at an average density of 4 per square mile (2/km2). The racial makeup of the county was 99.25% White, 0.05% Black or African American, 0.05% Native American, 0.03% Asian, 0.03% Pacific Islander, 0.30% from other races, and 0.29% from two or more races.  0.89% of the population were Hispanic or Latino of any race. 54.6% were of German, 8.2% Irish, 5.9% Polish, 5.3% Norwegian and 5.1% Swedish ancestry according to Census 2000.

There were 2,454 households, out of which 33.90% had children under the age of 18 living with them, 60.80% were married couples living together, 5.50% had a female householder with no husband present, and 30.70% were non-families. 29.10% of all households were made up of individuals, and 16.50% had someone living alone who was 65 years of age or older.  The average household size was 2.50 and the average family size was 3.11.

29.10% of the population is under the age of 18, 5.00% from 18 to 24, 24.20% from 25 to 44, 21.40% from 45 to 64, and 20.40% who were 65 years of age or older.  The median age was 40 years. For every 100 females there were 99.10 males.  For every 100 females age 18 and over, there were 96.40 males.

The median income for a household in the county was $31,444, and the median income for a family was $38,226. Males had a median income of $26,779 versus $18,438 for females. The per capita income for the county was $15,831.  About 8.30% of families and 10.40% of the population were below the poverty line, including 11.70% of those under age 18 and 11.60% of those age 65 or over.

Communities

Cities
 Albion (county seat)
 St. Edward

Villages
 Cedar Rapids
 Petersburg
 Primrose

Census-designated places
 Loretto
 Raeville

Unincorporated community
 Akron

Politics
Boone County voters have been strongly Republican for decades. In only one national election since 1936 has the county selected the Democratic Party candidate.

See also
 National Register of Historic Places listings in Boone County, Nebraska
 Olson Nature Preserve

References

External links

 Boone County Online
 Boone County chapter from History of the State of Nebraska. Chicago:The Western Historical Company. A.T. Andreas, Proprietor. 1882.
 Boone County entry from Semi-Centennial History of Nebraska, 1904

 
1871 establishments in Nebraska
Populated places established in 1871